() is the premier women's ice hockey league in Denmark.

Teams

2022–23 season 

Source:

Past participants
 AaB Ishockey Damer, 2009–2022
 Frederikshavn Ishockey Klub (as Frederikshavn IK and Frederikshavn White Hawks)
 IC Gentofte, 2011–2016
 Hellerup Idræts Klub (HIK), 1989–
 Kjøbenhavns Skøjteløberforening (KSF), 2009–2014
 Rungsted Ishockey Klub (Rungsted IK)
 Silkeborg Skøjteløberforening af 1896 (Silkeborg SF)
 Århus Ishockey Klub (Århus IK)

Champions

All-time medal count

Danish Champions by season 

Sources:

References
League information and statistics from Eliteprospects.com, and Eurohockey.com, and Hockeyarchives.info

External links
 Official league statistics from Danmarks Ishockey Union

Ice hockey leagues in Denmark
Women's ice hockey leagues in Europe
Women's sports leagues in Denmark